Pental Limited is an Australian manufacturer of household chemicals and cleaning products, and a publicly listed company on the Australian Stock Exchange.

Formerly known as Symex, it manufactures, distributes and exports many brands including:

 AIM Toothpaste
 Country Life Soap
 Huggie Fabric Softener
 Janola
 Jiffy Firelighters
 Little Lucifer Firelighters
 Lux Pure Soap Flakes
 Martha Gardener Country Homestead Wool Mix
 Softly laundry care
 Sunlight bar soap and dishwashing liquid 
 Velvet soap bar soap and dishwashing liquid 
 White King household bleach
 Procell ANZ
 Duracell

See also

List of companies of Australia
Manufacturing in Australia

References

External links

 http://www.ethical.org.au/company/?company=3166
 http://www.investsmart.com.au/shares/asx/SYMEX-HOLDINGS-LIMITED-SYM.asp

Companies listed on the Australian Securities Exchange
Manufacturing companies of Australia
Chemical companies of Australia